Robert Hickman Molesworth (24 November 1879 – 15 June 1948) was an Australian rules footballer who played with St Kilda in the Victorian Football League (VFL).

References

External links 

1879 births
1948 deaths
Australian rules footballers from Melbourne
St Kilda Football Club players
People from St Kilda, Victoria